This is a list of submissions to the 82nd Academy Awards for Best Foreign Language Film.  The Academy of Motion Picture Arts and Sciences has invited the film industries of various countries to submit their best film for the Academy Award for Best Foreign Language Film every year since the award was created in 1956. The award is handed out annually by the Academy to a feature-length motion picture produced outside the United States that contains primarily non-English dialogue. The Foreign Language Film Award Committee oversees the process and reviews all the submitted films.

The deadline for all countries to send in their submissions is September 30, 2009. The submitted motion pictures must be first released theatrically in their respective countries between October 1, 2008, and September 30, 2009.
For more details on the Academy's submission and nomination process for Best Foreign Language Film, see Rule Fourteen: Special Rules for the Best Foreign Language Film Award.

The Academy has received 67 official Oscar submissions, tying the record set in 2008. The submissions from Algeria and Mongolia were disqualified from competing.

A shortlist of nine semi-finalists was announced January 20, 2010. The official nominees were announced on February 2, 2010. The winner of the Academy Award for Best Foreign Language Film was Argentina's The Secret in Their Eyes.

Submissions

Notes 
  The Netherlands chose The Silent Army as their official submission on September 2, but the decision was appealed since many Dutch producers feared that it would be declined for having too much English-language dialogue. The Dutch Oscar committee reconvened the Oscar committee on September 21 to determine whether The Silent Army or a different film should represent the Netherlands. The committee came to the conclusion that the film met official Oscar requirements and has less than 50% English dialogue, and that the film would remain as the official Dutch Oscar submission. However, AMPAS concluded that The Silent Army was in fact ineligible because the version submitted to the Oscars was not the same as the version that played in Dutch cinemas. Winter in Wartime was selected to be the Dutch entry.
 's Oscar selection committee originally voted to submit Here and There, which is set in Belgrade and New York City and features a mixed American and Serbian cast. After consulting with the Academy, Serbia changed its submission since the film appears to contain more than 50% English dialogue.
  Sri Lanka originally announced that they would send Flowers of the Sky  but The Road from Elephant Pass was eventually announced to be Sri Lanka's final submission.
 Thirteen other countries (Afghanistan, Azerbaijan, Egypt, Iraq, Ireland, Jordan, Kyrgyzstan, Latvia, Lebanon, Nepal, Palestinian Territories, Singapore, and Ukraine) that submitted films within the three previous years opted not to send a movie for Oscar consideration in 2009.

References

External links
Official website of the Academy Awards
65 Countries in Competition for 2009 Foreign Language Film Oscar

82